is a railway station on the privately operated Chōshi Electric Railway Line in Chōshi, Chiba, Japan.

Lines

Station layout
The station consists of one side platform serving a single track with a passing loop. The line's maintenance depot and storage yard is located immediately adjacent to the station. The station is staffed.

History

The railway closed in November 1917, but was reopened on 5 July 1923 as the Chōshi Railway. Nakanochō was the name of the area at the time the station was built.

Passenger statistics
In fiscal 2010, the station was used by an average of 44 passengers daily (boarding passengers only). The passenger figures for past years are as shown below.

Surrounding area
 Yamasa head office and soy sauce factory
 Futaba Elementary School

See also
 List of railway stations in Japan

References

External links

 Choshi Electric Railway station information 

Stations of Chōshi Electric Railway Line
Railway stations in Chiba Prefecture
Railway stations in Japan opened in 1913